The soprano singing voice is the voice of children and the highest type of female voice with vocal range that typically lies between "middle C" (C4) and "high C" (C6) The soprano voice (unlike the mezzo-soprano voice) is stronger in the head register than the chest register, resulting in a bright and ringing tone. Some sopranos can sing one or more octaves above high C using the whistle register.

The term soprano was developed in relation to classical and operatic voices, where the classification is based not merely on the singer's vocal range but also on the tessitura and timbre of the voice. For classical and operatic singers, their voice type determines the roles they will sing and is a primary method of categorization. In non-classical music, singers are primarily defined by their genre and their gender not their vocal range. When the terms soprano, mezzo-soprano, contralto, tenor, baritone, and bass are used as descriptors of non-classical voices, they are applied more loosely than they would be to those of classical singers and generally refer only to the singer's perceived vocal range.

The following is a list of singers in country, popular music, jazz, classical crossover, and musical theatre who have been described as sopranos.

List of names

See also
 List of contraltos in non-classical music
 List of mezzo-sopranos in non-classical music
 List of basses in non-classical music
 List of baritones in non-classical music
 List of tenors in non-classical music
 Types and roles of sopranos in opera
 Voice classification in non-classical music
 Voice type

Notes

References

Non-classical music
Lists of singers
Lists of women in music